Itah Kandji-Murangi is a Namibian politician. She is Namibia's Minister of Higher Education, Training and Innovation.

In 2019 Kandji-Murangi was involved in a power struggle with the Namibia University of Science and Technology Advisory Board over who should take over the position of the founding rector, Tjama Tjivikua. Her interference led to the resignation of Board chairperson Esi Schimming-Chase.

References

Living people
Women members of the National Assembly (Namibia)
Members of the National Assembly (Namibia)
SWAPO politicians
Education ministers of Namibia
Year of birth missing (living people)
21st-century Namibian politicians
21st-century Namibian women politicians